Jafarabad (also Romanized as Ja‘farābād; also known as Jafarkhan (Persian: جافرخان), also Romanized as Jāfarkhān) is a village in Kuhdasht-e Shomali Rural District, in the Central District of Kuhdasht County, Lorestan Province, Iran. At the 2006 census, its population was 346, in 65 families.

References 

Towns and villages in Kuhdasht County